Seimetz is a surname. Notable people with the surname include: 

Amy Seimetz (born 1981), American actress, writer, producer, director, and editor
Frantz Seimetz (1858–1934), Luxembourg artist